Georges Navel (1904–1993) was a French laborer, writer, and anarchist.

Selected works 
1945: Travaux, Stock, (Prix Sainte-Beuve in 1946) [Man At Work, Dennis Dobson, 1949]
1950: Parcours, Gallimard
1952: Sable et limon, Gallimard
1960: Chacun son royaume, Gallimard
1982: Passages, Le Sycomore

References

Further reading 
 Georges Navel ou la seconde vue, Le Temps qu'il fait, 1982.
 L'écriture et la Vie - Trois Écrivains de l'éveil libertaire : Stig Dagerman, Georges Navel, Armand Robin, Éditions Libertaires, collection A contretemps, 2011.
 , Une aventure espagnole : un entretien avec Georges Navel, (À contretemps), n°14-15, December 2003, Full text.
 , Histoire de la littérature libertaire en France, Albin Michel, 1990, Read online.

External links 
 Georges Navel on Babelio
 Georges Navel on Dictionnaire des militants anarchistes
 Georges Navel "Travaux" on Texture
 "Travaux" on Le Matricule des Anges
 Georges Navel ou la vie éveillée, a film by Jean-Daniel Pillault

20th-century French non-fiction writers
Prix Sainte-Beuve winners
1904 births
People from Pont-à-Mousson
1993 deaths
Anarcho-communists
French anarchists
Proletarian literature